The Scotland national futsal team represents Scotland in international futsal competitions such as the FIFA Futsal World Cup and the European Championships and is controlled by the Scottish Football Association.

The team played its first home match in April 2016, against Gibraltar.

Tournament records

FIFA Futsal World Cup

UEFA European Futsal Championship

Home Nations Futsal Championship

Matches

vs opponent

Current squad

The current squad for the World Cup 2022 Qualifiers - Varna Bulgaria.

Scotland Player Caps

These players have all represented the Scotland national futsal team. (as of January 2020)

Scotland Player Goals

These players have all scored for Scotland national futsal team.
(as of 01-12-2019)

Coaching staff

References

Football
Association, Scotland Football
European national futsal teams